Tamarix parviflora is a species of tamarisk known by the common name smallflower tamarisk.

It is native to south-eastern Europe (in Albania, East Aegean Islands, Greece, Crete, Turkey, Turkey-in-Europe, Yugoslavia and to Iran and Palestine, (in Western Asia). It has been introduced elsewhere, in places such as; Algeria, Austria, Cape Provinces, Corsica, Italy, Libya, Mexico, Pakistan, Sicily, Spain, West Himalayas and western North America (Arizona, California, Colorado, Illinois, Kansas, Kentucky, Mississippi, Nevada, New Mexico, New York, North Carolina, Oklahoma, Oregon and Texas), where it is an invasive introduced species.

It easily inhabits moist habitat, especially in saline soils. It is a shrub or tree growing up to about 5 meters tall. The branching twigs are covered in tiny linear leaves no more than 2 or 3 millimetres long. The inflorescence is a dense spike with flowers 1 to 4 centimeters long. Each tiny flower has four pink petals.

It was first published and described by Augustin Pyramus de Candolle in Prodr. vol.3 on page 97 in 1828.

References

External links
Jepson Manual Treatment
Washington Burke Museum
Photo gallery

parviflora
Flora of Europe
Plants described in 1828